Lucie Edwards is a Canadian diplomat, who worked in the Department of Foreign Affairs, Trade and Development from 1976 to 2009, as the high commissioner to India, South Africa, Kenya and permanent representative to the United Nations Environmental program. She founded the Global Issues Bureau and served as assistant deputy minister for Corporate Services in Ottawa. 

She received the Public Service Award of Excellence in 1995 for her humanitarian work during the Rwanda genocide and was awarded the Lifetime Achievement Award of Excellence from the Department of Foreign Affairs in 2009. Lucie Edwards has over 20 years of experience representing Canada at the United Nations and regional development agencies. Her interests include good governance, food security, poverty alleviation, primary health care and sustainable development. Today, she works at the crossroads of science, the environment, and international development having completed her doctoral dissertation in Global Governance at the University of Waterloo(2009–2013). She was the Ashley Fellow 2011 at Trent University.

Early life and education
She was born in Ottawa, Ontario. She was a contestant on Reach for the Top and valedictorian of her graduating class at Laurentian High School in Ottawa, Ontario.

In recognition of exceptional academic and extracurricular achievement, she was a recipient of the prestigious Champlain Scholarship at Trent University in Peterborough, Ontario. As an undergraduate student backpacking around the Middle East, her bus was hijacked in Lebanon. She earned a Bachelor of Arts Economics and History Honours, from Trent University in 1976. She took the Foreign Affairs Officer's exam initially because she thought it would be good practice for the law school entrance exam. She accepted a job offer on the Middle East desk at the Department of External now Foreign Affairs in 1976. She earned a Masters in Public Administration from Harvard Kennedy School. In 1984. Lucie Edwards married Thomas Roach (BA, Trent University, 1970) in 1979.

Career
As a Canadian public servant and diplomat, Lucie Edwards has held various roles. In 1976, Lucie Edwards was one of five women who joined the Department of External Affairs (DEA), now the Department of Foreign Affairs and International Trade.

Honours 
Ms. Edwards was awarded the 2009 Award of Excellence—Lifetime Achievement Award for her career in the Foreign Service.
In 1995, Lucie Edwards received the Public Service Award of Excellence, the Public Service’s highest award, for her mission's humanitarian work during the civil war in Rwanda.  She  received the Merit Award, 1994 for consular operations in Rwanda, Department of Foreign Affairs. She was awarded the Merit Award, 1989 for human rights work in South Africa, Department of Foreign Affairs.
She was the Ashley Fellow at Trent University 2011/12 where she served as a "diplomat in residence"  and spoke to classes in Environmental Resource Science / Studies, International Development Studies, Politics, and Economics.

Select publications
 "We are Dust: Human Security and the San People of Southern Africa" Human Security Conference University of Toronto/University of Waterloo December 2009.
 "Canadian Foreign Policy Towards Africa", South African Yearbook of International Affairs, South African Institute of International Affairs, 2001.
 "Day 58 of the Rwanda Crisis", Bout de Papier, Vol. 12, 1995.
 "Freedom is Rising", Musicworks, No. 43.
 "Resource Development in Labrador", Alternatives 1977.

Quotes 
 "The youth will see the effects of climate change in their own lifetimes, and that of their children. We need their voices in the debate."
 "I hope that we will have peace everywhere in the world."
 The creation of peaceful societies encompasses a range of issues that must be addressed simultaneously. These include conflict prevention, mediation, cease-fire negotiations, the delivery of humanitarian aid, post-war reconstruction, and the establishment of strong civil societies. Such issues are difficult to address in any country, particularly "in a society that is undergoing development passage and has suffered a substantial loss of infrastructure and human capital."
 "Diplomacy is not a special language", diplomacy is "being direct, being honest, and believing in Lord Ganesha."

References

 Margaret K. Weiers Envoys extraordinary: Women of the Canadian foreign service Chapter 18 Lucie Edwards -Making a Difference Dundurn Press Toronto 1995
 LGen Romeo A Dallaire Shake Hands with the Devil: the failure of humanity in Rwanda 2003

External links
Department of Foreign Affairs: History: Introduction
Department of Foreign Affairs Canada
Diplomatic Missions' by McGill University Press, which was edited by Robert Wolfe 1999
Guide to Women Leaders
High Commissioner Lucie Edwards (and others) interviewed regarding Conflict in Rwanda

1954 births
People from Ottawa
Harvard Kennedy School alumni
Living people
Canadian women ambassadors
High Commissioners of Canada to South Africa
High Commissioners of Canada to Namibia
High Commissioners of Canada to Lesotho
High Commissioners of Canada to Eswatini
High Commissioners of Canada to Mauritius
High Commissioners of Canada to Kenya
High Commissioners of Canada to Uganda
Ambassadors of Canada to Rwanda
Ambassadors of Canada to Burundi
Ambassadors of Canada to Eritrea
Ambassadors of Canada to Somalia